Camille Henri Raoul Lagesse DFC & Bar (10 January 1893 – 15 February 1976) was a Canadian First World War flying ace, officially credited with 20 victories.

Text of citations

Distinguished Flying Cross
"Lt. (T./Capt.) Camille Henri Raoul Lagesse.
When on wireless interception duty Capt. Lagesse, in company with another officer, was attacked by seven scouts. Engaging one, he followed it down from 11,000 feet to 2,000 feet, when it crashed. Bold in attack, skilful in execution, he has proved himself on many occasions to be a fine airman."

Distinguished Flying Cross - Bar
"Lieut. (A../Capt.) Camille Henri Raoul Lagesse, D.F.C. (FRANCE)
A scout leader of marked ability and daring who, since 28 August, has destroyed thirteen enemy aeroplanes, displaying at all times brilliant leadership and courage. On 2 October, when leading a patrol of four machines, he dived on eight Fokkers; four of these were destroyed, Captain Lagesse accounting for one."

References

Notes

Websites

Further reading
Aces of Canada: Camille Lagesse. n.d. <http://www.theaerodrome.com/aces/canada/lagesse.html>.

Canadian World War I flying aces
1893 births
1976 deaths
Recipients of the Distinguished Flying Cross (United Kingdom)
Royal Flying Corps officers